Edward Augustus Wild (November 25, 1825 – August 28, 1891) was an American homeopathic doctor and a brigadier general in the Union Army during the American Civil War.

Early life and career
Wild was a native of Brookline, Massachusetts, the second son of homeopath Dr. Charles Wild and his wife Mary. He earned his medical degree in 1846 from Harvard and at Jefferson Medical College, and he also studied homeopathy, becoming a member of the Massachusetts Society of Homeopathy. Wild then traveled and studied medicine in Paris, France.

Wild practiced alongside his father as a homeopathic physician in Brookline until 1855, when he and his new wife traveled to Turkey. He joined the Ottoman Army as a medical officer and served in the Crimean War. He then returned to Massachusetts and resumed his medical practice.

Civil War service
With the outbreak of the Civil War, Wild enlisted in the Union Army as a front-line officer, preferring to command troops rather than to treat their injuries. He served as a captain in Company A of the 1st Regiment Massachusetts Volunteer Infantry. from May 1861 until July 1862. He fought in First Battle of Bull Run and again in the Peninsula Campaign, where he was wounded at the Battle of Seven Pines. On August 21, he was appointed Colonel of the 35th Massachusetts Volunteer Infantry and assigned to the Army of the Potomac's IX Corps. Wild led his new regiment into combat during the Maryland Campaign. At the Battle of South Mountain, Wild suffered another severe wound, one that necessitated the amputation of his left arm. He returned home to recuperate.

By April 1863, Wild had recovered enough to resume his military duties, and was promoted to brigadier general on April 24 and assigned to recruiting duties. A fervent abolitionist, he aggressively recruited black soldiers for the United States Colored Troops, as well as helping recruit white officers to lead them, including helping Robert Gould Shaw fill his officer complement for the 54th Massachusetts Infantry. Wild was friends with fellow abolitionist and author Harriet Beecher Stowe and enlisted her half-brother, James C. Beecher, as a white officer in one of the new black regiments. When Wild was able to resume his field duties, he freed hundreds of slaves in North Carolina, resettled them safely on Roanoke Island in North Carolina, and then recruited many of them to join the military.

Wild took command of a brigade of black infantry that soon became known as "Wild's African Brigade". The brigade, headquartered in Norfolk, comprised the 55th Massachusetts Infantry, and the 2nd and 3rd North Carolina Colored Volunteers (which later became renumbered as the 36th and 37th U.S. Colored Troops respectively). Wild's men served in the Charleston, South Carolina, area and saw action in numerous skirmishes and battles in that region, including an expedition to South Mills and Camden Court House in December.

Transferred to the Army of the Potomac in 1864, Wild and his black soldiers participated in the Overland Campaign and the subsequent Siege of Petersburg,  Wild's men constructed and manned Fort Pocahontas, an earthen-walled Virginia fort on the James River that during the Battle of Wilson's Wharf withstood an attack on May 24 by Fitzhugh Lee's Confederates.

In early 1865, Wild's men performed picket duty along the Appomattox River. They were a part of the large force of black troops under Godfrey Weitzel that occupied the former Confederate national capital, Richmond, Virginia, holding that city through the end of the war. Wild's men were among those troops who witnessed the historic visit of President Abraham Lincoln to Richmond following the city's fall to the Union forces.

In July, Wild ordered and supervised the torture of several members of the Chennault family in Danburg, Georgia. Suspecting them of being involved in the missing Confederate gold, he had their hands tied behind their backs and their thumbs strung up. In the case of one of the prisoners, this caused the flesh to be stripped from the bones. Members of his unit forced the Chennault ladies to disrobe in search of "stolen" jewelry. Wild was honorably discharged in January 1866, receiving no punishment for his actions (which may or may not have measured up to war crimes).

Postbellum years

After the war, Wild could no longer practice medicine because of his war injuries. He engaged in silver mining in Nevada as a superintendent of operations. He operated in the Diana Mine, now part of the Berlin-Ichthyosaur State Park near Austin. He traveled extensively in South America. He died in Medellín, Colombia, and was buried in the city's Cementerio de San Pedro.

References in Popular Culture 

Wild is portrayed in Black Cloud Rising, 2022 historic fiction by David Wright Faladé. He is in command of the protagonist and narrator, Richard Etheridge, who in March 1863 was among the first enlistees in the African Brigade, later known as 36th U.S. Colored Troops.

See also

 List of American Civil War generals (Union)
 List of Massachusetts generals in the American Civil War

References

Bibliography
 Bowen, James Lorenzo, Massachusetts in the War, 1861-1865 (1888) pp. 1008–1010.
 Heitman, Francis, Historical Register and Dictionary of the United States Army 1789-1903, Washington, U.S. Government Printing Office, 1903.
 Fort Pocahontas web site

Further reading
 Casstevens, Frances H., Edward A. Wild and the African Brigade in the Civil War. Jefferson, North Carolina: McFarland & Company, 2005. .

External links
 Raising the African Brigade: Early Black Recruitment in Civil War North Carolina

1825 births
1891 deaths
19th-century Ottoman military personnel
American abolitionists
American amputees
American homeopaths
Burials in Colombia
Harvard Medical School alumni
Ottoman military personnel of the Crimean War
Ottoman military doctors
People from Brookline, Massachusetts
People of Massachusetts in the American Civil War
Thomas Jefferson University alumni
Union Army generals
19th-century physicians from the Ottoman Empire
19th-century American physicians